Wetzlar station is a through railway station in the city of Wetzlar in the German state of Hesse. The station, which serves Deutsche Bahn's Dill and Lahntal lines, constitutes (together with the adjacent bus station) Wetzlar's most important public transport node.

History
The first Wetzlar station, built in 1862 in the district of Niedergirmes, was an "island station", with the main station building built between the tracks. This building still stands. The current station was originally completed in January 1917 in the Art Nouveau style, but it was demolished in 1981 and rebuilt in the Modern style.

Train services
The following services currently call at Wetzlar:
Main-Sieg-Express Siegen - Dillenburg - Gießen - Friedberg - Frankfurt (Main)
Mittelhessen-Express Dillenburg - Gießen - Friedberg - Frankfurt (Main)

Operations 
Wetzlar station has five platform tracks, served by Regionalbahn, Regional-Express, and EuroCity trains.

Trains operate through the following platforms:

East of the passenger station in the district of Garbenheim is Wetzlar freight yard, which has been the most important facility of its kind in central Hesse since December 2006.

Long distance 
In the 1980s and before, there were many daily express services from Wetzlar station to remote destinations such as Oberstdorf. In the early 1990s there were regular fast train connections at two-hour intervals to Frankfurt (Main) Hauptbahnhof and Münster Hauptbahnhof. From 1993, these services were replaced by Interregio line 22, Frankfurt–Münster. Once a day there was a direct Interregio connection from Wetzlar to Norddeich Mole (Norderney). The inter-regional trains on the Dill line were, however, gradually thinned out from 2001. More recently, in December 2002, the Norderney service was abolished.

From December 2009 until December 2011, Wetzlar station was connected to the long-distance network for the first time in six years. In the morning there was a EuroCity service from Wetzlar via Frankfurt, Stuttgart, and Munich to Klagenfurt. A through carriage also gave a direct connection to Ljubljana and Zagreb. The return service from Croatia, Slovenia, and Austria reached Wetzlar in the evening and continued to Siegen. This service was discontinued in December 2011.

Modernization
Between 2011 and 2012 the station underwent a major reconstruction. Among other things, the platforms were replaced by new higher platforms and the platform canopies were restored. The bus station, formerly located 150 metres away, was moved to the front of the station building. The passenger tunnel under the station was extended to connect with the park-and-ride area on the north side of the station and the suburb of Niedergirmes.

Connections 
The adjoining bus station serves regional and local bus routes. In the station forecourt there is a taxi stand and short-term parking. There are also various parking facilities nearby.

References

Buildings and structures in Wetzlar
Railway stations in Hesse
Railway stations in Germany opened in 1862